OmniDiskSweeper is a utility by The Omni Group similar to ncdu that recursively searches a filesystem and displays entries sorted by size.

It can be used to find and remove unused files in macOS, such as unused language files (.lproj).

D
MacOS-only software
Disk usage analysis software